Twice Blessed is a 1945 comedy film directed by Harry Beaumont and starring Preston Foster, Gail Patrick, and Lee and Lyn Wilde. It was an MGM vehicle for the Wilde twins, who were first introduced in Andy Hardy's Blonde Trouble (1944).

Plot summary

Stephanie (Lyn Wilde) and Terry (Lee Wilde) are two identical twins who have been split up since their parents divorced seven years before. Although identical in appearance, the twins are very different: Stephanie is shy but brilliant, while Terry is outgoing and loves dancing. When the twins finally meet in person, each envies the life style of the other. They decide, without telling their father Jeff (Preston Foster) or their mother Mary (Gail Patrick), to switch families for a day or two.

The switch quickly starts trouble, for both twins. Stephanie, disguised as Terry, is expected to win a jitterbug contest, but she cannot dance nearly as well as Terry. Terry, disguised as Stephanie, is expected to behave quietly and properly, but she just wants to have fun. Both boyfriends of the twins are surprised to see their girlfriends acting so different: Mickey is happy to see Stephanie (actually Terry) is more confident, while Jimmy is pleased to see Terry (actually Stephanie) is more gentle.

Mickey takes Stephanie to a charity event, where Stephanie surprises him with her dancing talent. Soon after, Mickey gets into a fight with a rude dancer, and the charity event erupts into a brawl. A reporter named Alice (Jeff's ex-girlfriend) photographs Stephanie dancing wildly and caught up in the fight, with plans to blackmail Stephanie's father, and force him to marry her. The twins team up with their new boyfriends to successfully outsmart Alice, reunite their parents, and find true love.

Cast
 Preston Foster as Jeff Turner
 Gail Patrick as Mary Hale
 Lee Wilde as Terry Turner
 Lyn Wilde as Stephanie Hale
 Richard Gaines as Senator John Pringle
 Jean Porter as Kitty
 Marshall Thompson as Jimmy
 Jimmy Lydon as Mickey Pringle
 Gloria Hope as Alice
 Douglas Cowan as Jake
 Warren Mills as Whitey
 Joel Friedkin as Mr. Winters
 Ralph Brooke as Chet
 Ralph Hoopes as Lionel
 Don Hayden as Alfi
 Tommy Bond as Horace
 Ethel Smith as Herself at the organ

Gallery

References

External links 

 
 
 
 

1945 films
1945 comedy films
American comedy films
Films directed by Harry Beaumont
Metro-Goldwyn-Mayer films
American black-and-white films
1940s American films